Ekinlik can refer to the following villages in Turkey:

 Ekinlik, Başmakçı
 Ekinlik, Olur
 Ekinlik, Susurluk